Hope Anita Smith is an American poet and author of children's books, best known for her Coretta Scott King Award-winning middle grade novel Keeping the Night Watch.

Personal life 
Smith was born in Akron, Ohio. She was introduced to the children's publishing industry via fellow author and teacher Myra Cohn Livingston, whose class she attended and ultimately discovered her voice and interest in writing for children there. She attended La Sierra University from 1980 to 1983, studying English, but ultimately did not graduate.

Smith now lives in Los Angeles, California.

Selected works 
Smith wrote her second picture book My Daddy Rules the World: Poems about Dads, with the intention of celebrating fathers all over the world because she cites to have always had a soft spot for the way fathers interact with their children, also intending to give credit to fathers.

Bibliography 
Picture books

 Mother Poems (Henry Holt, 2009)
 My Daddy Rules the World: Poems about Dads (Henry Holt, 2017)

Middle grade

 The Way a Door Closes, illustrated by Shane W. Evans (Henry Holt, 2003)
 Keeping the Night Watch (Henry Holt, 2008)
 It Rained Warm Bread, co-authored with Gloria Moskowitz-Sweet, illustrated by Lea Lyon (Henry Holt, 2019)

Awards and honors 

 2004 John Steptoe New Talent Author Award for Author for The Way a Door Closes, illustrated by Shane W. Evans
 2004 Judy Lopez Memorial Award for Children's Literature for The Way a Door Closes, illustrated by Shane W. Evans
 2004 Claudia Lewis Award for The Way a Door Closes, illustrated by Shane W. Evans
 2008 School Library Journal's Best Books of 2008 for Keeping the Night Watch
 2009 Coretta Scott King Honor for Keeping the Night Watch
 2009 American Library Association Notable Children's Books for Keeping the Night Watch

References 

Living people
Women writers of young adult literature
Year of birth missing (living people)
21st-century American women writers
21st-century African-American writers
La Sierra University alumni
Writers from Akron, Ohio
21st-century African-American women writers